"Starry Night" is a single by guitarist Joe Satriani, released on June 10, 2002 through Epic Records. It is an instrumental track from his ninth studio album Strange Beautiful Music, and was nominated for Best Rock Instrumental Performance at the 2003 Grammys.

Track listing

References

Joe Satriani songs
2002 songs
Rock instrumentals
2002 singles
Epic Records singles